NGC 4698 is a barred spiral galaxy located around 55 million light years away from Earth in the constellation of Virgo. It belongs to the Virgo Cluster of galaxies and is positioned near the northeastern edge of this assemblage. The morphological classification of NGC 4698 in the De Vaucouleurs system is SA(s)ab, which indicates a purely spiral structure with moderate to tightly wound arms. It is inclined to the line of sight from the Earth by an angle of 53° along a position angle of 170°.

A unique feature of this galaxy is that the stars and dust of the nuclear disk are rotating in a direction that is aligned perpendicularly to the galactic disk. The bulge likewise appears elongated out of the galactic plane. This unusual alignment may have been the result of a past merger event.

NGC 4698 is classified as a Seyfert-2 galaxy with an active galactic nucleus, which displays a prominent emission of radio and X-ray energy from the core while showing narrow emission lines in the optical spectrum. The unified model of Seyfert galaxies proposes that the nucleus of a Seyfert 2 galaxy is obscured by a thick torus of gas and dust. However, the varying X-ray emission of the core of NGC 4698 shows little indication of being obstructed, suggesting instead that the source of the energy emission is generally unobscured but anemic in nature.

Gallery

References

External links 
 

Virgo (constellation)
Virgo Cluster
4698
43254
07970
Seyfert galaxies